Archeological Site 3PP144 is a prehistoric rock art site in Pope County, Arkansas.  The art at the site, which is Ozark-St. Francis National Forest, consists two drawings in black pigment, of unknown age.  This site are part of a larger collection within the state that are expected to improve the understanding of how rock art in the Ozark Mountains region was made, and for what purpose.

The site was listed on the National Register of Historic Places in 2007.

See also
National Register of Historic Places listings in Pope County, Arkansas

References

Archaeological sites on the National Register of Historic Places in Arkansas
National Register of Historic Places in Pope County, Arkansas
Ozark–St. Francis National Forest
Rock art in North America
Native American history of Arkansas